The Austria women's national volleyball team represents Austria in international women's volleyball competitions and friendly matches.

References
 Volleyball Association of Austria

National women's volleyball teams
Volleyball
Volleyball in Austria